Secrets of Chinatown is a 1935 Canadian-American mystery thriller film directed by Fred C. Newmeyer and starring Nick Stuart, Lucile Browne and James Flavin.

The film was shot at the Willows Park Studios in Victoria, British Columbia and on location in Vancouver by Kenneth J. Bishop's Commonwealth Productions. It was not able to qualify for the British Quota which was a blow to its commercial prospects. Commonwealth went out of business before the film was released, and it was used as part of the arrangement to pay off creditors. When Bishop relaunched production with a new company two years later, he signed a distribution contract with Columbia Pictures and too much greater care to make sure his films were eligible for the British Quota.

Synopsis
A private detective is brought in by the police commissioner to investigate the reasons for a major outbreak of crime in Chinatown.

Cast
 Nick Stuart as Robert Rand
 Lucile Browne as Zenobia
 Raymond Lawrence as Donegal Dawn
 James Flavin as Brandhma
 Harry Hewitson a Chan Tow Ling
 James McGrath as Commissioner
 Reginald Hincks as Dr. Franklin
 John Barnard as Doverscourt
 Arthur Legge-Willis as Yogi of Madrada

References

Bibliography
 Morris, Peter. Embattled Shadows: A History of Canadian Cinema, 1895-1939. McGill-Queen's Press - MQUP, 1992.

External links
 

1935 films
1935 mystery films
1930s English-language films
English-language Canadian films
Canadian mystery films
American mystery films
Films directed by Fred C. Newmeyer
Films shot in Vancouver
Films set in Vancouver
1930s American films
1930s Canadian films